Nemanja Krstić (born March 2, 1993) is a Serbian professional basketball player for Kapfenberg Bulls of the Austrian Basketball Superliga. He also represent the Serbian national basketball team in the international competitions.

Professional career
He made his professional debut with KK Hemofarm during the 2011–12 season. In the summer of 2012, he signed with Mega Vizura. In July 2015, he left Mega and signed with KK Igokea.

On July 26, 2016, Krstić signed a one-year deal with Mornar Bar. On December 9, 2016, he parted ways with Mornar after averaging 3.6 points and 1.5 rebounds per game in ten ABA League games.
On February 7, 2017, Krstić signed with Kapfenberg Bulls for the rest of the 2016–17 ÖBL season.

On August 17, 2017, Krstić signed with Dynamic. In 40 games of the Serbian League with Dynamic, he averaged 15.5 points and 5.6 rebounds per game.

On September 6, 2018, Krstić signed with Novi Pazar. In 36 games of the Serbian League, he averaged 18.6 points, 6 rebounds and 2.6 assists per game. He was the best player in regular stage of Basketball League of Serbia.
With average 20.3 points, he was  Serbian SuperLeague Top Scorer.

On August 9, 2019, Krstić signed with the Hungarian team Szolnoki Olaj KK. He averaged 8.4 points and 3.2 rebounds per game. On August 21, 2020, Krstić rejoined the Kapfenberg Bulls in Austria.

National team career
Krstić was a member of the Serbian national basketball team at the EuroBasket 2013.

See also 
 List of Serbia men's national basketball team players

References

External links
 Nemanja Krstić at aba-liga.com
 Nemanja Krstić at eurobasket.com
 Nemanja Krstić at fiba.com

1993 births
Living people
ABA League players
Basketball League of Serbia players
Kapfenberg Bulls players
KK Dynamic players
KK Hemofarm players
KK Igokea players
KK Mega Basket players
KK Mornar Bar players
OKK Novi Pazar players
People from Kladovo
Serbia men's national basketball team players
Serbian expatriate basketball people in Austria
Serbian expatriate basketball people in Bosnia and Herzegovina
Serbian expatriate basketball people in Hungary
Serbian expatriate basketball people in Montenegro
Serbian men's basketball players
Szolnoki Olaj KK players
Shooting guards
Small forwards